The chapters of the Japanese shōnen manga series , written and illustrated by Kazurou Inoue, was serialized in the weekly shōnen manga magazine Weekly Shōnen Sunday by Shogakukan from September 2002 to July 2004. The series is about a high school boy named Seiji Sawamura who one day finds his right hand replaced with a girl named Midori Kasugano.

The series includes 85 chapters, which have been collected in eight tankōbon volumes. The first volume of Midori Days was released on January 18, 2003, while the eighth and final volume was released on October 18, 2004. The series has been released in English in North America by Viz Media, in Singapore by Chuang Yi, and in Australia by Madman Entertainment.

An anime television series adaptation was produced by Pierrot. It aired in Japan from April to June 2004. It was licensed in North America by Media Blasters.



Volume list

References

Midori Days